Carson Pirie Scott & Co. (also known as Carson's) is an American department store that was founded in 1854, which grew to over 50 locations, primarily in the Midwestern United States.  Sold to the holding company of Bon-Ton in 2006, but still operated under the Carson name, the entire Bon-Ton collection of stores, including Carson's, went into bankruptcy and closed in 2018.  Bon-Ton's intellectual property was quickly sold while in bankruptcy, and the new owners reopened shortly afterwards as a BrandX virtual retailer.

The Carson Pirie Scott name is associated with the Carson, Pirie, Scott and Company Building designed by Louis Sullivan, built in 1899 for the retail firm Schlesinger & Mayer, and expanded and sold to Carson Pirie Scott in 1904, and occupied by them for more than a century.

History

Beginnings

The chain began in 1854 when Scotsmen Samuel Carson and John Thomas Pirie first clerked in the Murray's dry goods store in Peru, Illinois - then opened their own store in LaSalle followed by one in Amboy.

In 1871, the Great Chicago Fire destroyed 60% of the store's stock.

John Edwin Scott operated a dry goods store in Ottawa, Illinois. He later moved up to Chicago and became the first partner of Samuel Carson and John T. Pirie in the ownership of a dry goods store, well known today as Carson Pirie Scott & Co. Two of John Scott's sons, Robert L. and Frederick H., were members of the department store firm.

In 1961, Carson Pirie Scott & Co. greatly expanded in Illinois by purchasing the 20 unit Block & Kuhl chain headquartered in Peoria.

In 1980, to diversify its business, Carson Pirie Scott & Co. borrowed $108 million to buy Dobbs Houses, Inc., an airline caterer and owner of the Toddle House and Steak 'n Egg Kitchen restaurant chains.  These were sold in 1988, as was the County Seat clothing chain.

In 1989, Carson Pirie Scott & Co. was acquired by P.A. Bergner & Co. (founded in Peoria), who operated the Bergner's, Charles V. Weise, Myers Brothers and Boston Store chains.

Bergner's bankruptcy
In 1991, P.A. Bergner & Co. filed for Chapter 11 bankruptcy; upon emerging from bankruptcy in 1993, it became a NASDAQ publicly traded company, changing its operating name to Carson Pirie Scott & Co. One year later, the company commenced trading on the NYSE under the CRP symbol.

Acquisition by Proffitt's/Saks
By 1998, Carson Pirie Scott & Co. ownership was held by Proffitt's, Inc., (later renamed Saks Incorporated to reflect the acquisition of Saks Fifth Avenue).  The Carson Pirie Scott, Bergner's, and Boston Store chains, along with Younkers and Herberger's nameplates, eventually operated as Saks' Northern Department Store Group (NDSG), based in Milwaukee, Wisconsin.  In late 2005, however, the group was put up for sale as Saks Incorporated tried to refocus itself primarily on its core Saks Fifth Avenue stores.

Sale to The Bon-Ton and store closings

Carson's and its associated stores became part of  The Bon-Ton Stores Inc. in a $1.1 billion deal completed on March 6, 2006. The group's merchandising and marketing base remained in Milwaukee.

Bon-Ton converted Elder-Beerman stores in Indiana and Michigan to the newly shortened Carson's name in 2011 and 2012. The chain expanded into Metro Detroit in 2013 with the conversion of three Parisian stores.

Bon-Ton announced on April 17, 2018 that they would cease operations and began liquidating all 267 stores after two liquidators, Great American Group and Tiger Capital Group, won an auction for the company. The bid was estimated to be worth $775.5 million. This included all remaining Carson's stores after 164 years of operation. According to national retail reporter Mitch Nolen, stores closed within 10 to 12 weeks.

Reopening
The intellectual property of Bon-Ton, including Carson's, was quickly sold in bankruptcy to CSC Generation, and online retail was reopened.  The new owners, based in Merrillville, Indiana, were also exploring opening new store locations. On October 29, 2018; Under this new ownership and using the same company and stores' names, Bon-Ton started announcing it would reopen the Evergreen Park, Illinois Carson's store on November 24 (Black Friday)–one of Bon-Ton's first brick-and-mortar stores to reopen. Bon-Ton has also announced plans to open brick-and-mortar Carson's stores in Bloomingdale, Lombard and Orland Park. The sole location to return to operation was in Evergreen Park; the company never followed through in Orland Park and Lombard. The Evergreen Park location closed in October 2020 as a result of the COVID-19 pandemic. Carson's currently has no brick and mortar stores and exists only as on online retailer. As of November, 2021 Carson's website is preparing for another relaunch by BrandX who has also acquired the Stage Store trademarks.

See also
 Chicago architecture
 Edens Plaza -shopping center formerly owned by Carson's, and formerly featuring a Carson's location

References

Further reading
 Siry, Joseph M.  Carson Pirie Scott: Louis Sullivan and the Chicago Department Store. Chicago: Univ. of Chicago Press, 1988.

External links 

website (Archive)
The Bon-Ton Stores, Inc. investor relations home page

Department stores of the United States
Retail companies established in 1854
Retail companies disestablished in 2018
Clothing retailers of the United States
Companies based in Lee County, Illinois
Companies based in Milwaukee
Defunct companies based in Chicago
1854 establishments in Illinois
2018 disestablishments in Illinois
Companies that filed for Chapter 11 bankruptcy in 1991
Companies that filed for Chapter 11 bankruptcy in 2018